Rhythms (in French: Rythmes) is a painting by the French artist Robert Delaunay from 1934.

The picture is painted in oil on canvas. It was inspired by the round shapes that marked the return of the artist to orphism and study of harmony in painting. Its dimensions are 145 x 113 cm. The picture is part of the collection of the Centre Georges Pompidou.

References

1934 paintings
Paintings by Robert Delaunay